The Graysonia, Nashville & Ashdown Railroad was a shortline rail carrier in the state of Arkansas, with rails running from Nashville, Arkansas to Ashdown, Arkansas.  It operated from 1922 to 1998.

History
The trackage can be traced to the Memphis, Paris and Gulf Railroad, incorporated in 1906.  That line's original vision was to link Nashville, Arkansas to Memphis, Tennessee and Paris, Texas. The name changed in 1910 to the Memphis, Dallas and Gulf Railway.  The railroad constructed a line from Ashland, Arkansas to Shawmut, Arkansas, about 61 miles.  When the railroad went into foreclosure in 1922, the Graysonia, Nashville & Ashdown was incorporated to purchase the entire Ashland-to-Shawmut route.  However, the Nashville to Murfreesboro segment was purchased by another line, and 19 miles were abandoned, leaving the Graysonia with about 27 miles from Nashville to Ashdown.  (Graysonia, Arkansas, then a lumber mill town and now a ghost town, did not end up on the final route, being northeast of and not between Nashville and Ashdown.)

By mid-century, 75% of the line's business came from hauling cement and quarry rock. The trackage was relocated in the 1960s to make room for a dam project.  In 1998, the line was purchased by the Kansas City Southern.

The trackage was subsequently leased to Watco in 2005, and is currently operated by the Arkansas Southern Railroad.

Equipment and buildings
In 1926, the line obtained a Baldwin 2-6-0 “Mogul” steam freight engine, originally numbered as #203 but later renumbered as #26.  That engine, sold by the line in 1952, is now on static display at the Illinois Railway Museum as the Graysonia Nashville & Ashdown 26.

Other locomotives used at one time or another include #55, an Alco S4 diesel; #74R, also an S4; and, #80, an EMD MP15DC diesel.

The Graysonia train depot in Ashdown, Arkansas appears on the National Register of Historic Places listings in Little River County, Arkansas as the Memphis, Paris and Gulf Railroad Depot.

References

Defunct Arkansas railroads
Transportation in Little River County, Arkansas
Transportation in Howard County, Arkansas
Railway companies established in 1922
Railway companies disestablished in 1998
1922 establishments in Arkansas
1998 disestablishments in Arkansas